Chusquea mimosa is a bamboo species in the genus Chusquea. It is native to southern Brazil.<ref name = powo>Chusquea mimosa McClure & L.B.Sm. Plants of the World Online. Accessed 2 March 2023.</ref>

Subspecies
There are two accepted subspecies:
 Chusquea mimosa subsp. australis L.G.Clark
 Chusquea mimosa subsp. mimosa (syn. Chusquea elegans'' Renv.) It is native to Paraná (state) in Brazil.

References

External links

mimosa
Endemic flora of Brazil
Flora of Paraná (state)
Grasses of South America
Plants described in 1967